Ruth B. Balser (born October 30, 1948) is an American state legislator serving in the Massachusetts House of Representatives. She is a Newton resident and a member of the Democratic Party.

Balser received her bachelor's degree at the University of Rochester and her PhD at New York University. She was a practicing clinical psychologist. She was an alderman for the City of Newton from 1988 to 1995 and has been a member of the state legislature since 1999.

Balser was a political opponent of former Massachusetts House Speaker Thomas Finneran. She voted against Finneran's renewal of tenure as Speaker in 2003. She, along with several other opponents of Finneran, were demoted to appointments on a committee that held training sessions for House members. Her political fortunes improved when Finneran was replaced by Salvatore DiMasi as Speaker in 2004. Balser served two terms as the House Chair of the Joint Committee on Mental Health and Substance Abuse.

She ran for mayor of Newton in 2009 and was endorsed by The Boston Globe. She lost narrowly to former John Kerry aide Setti Warren, 51–49 percent.

See also
 Massachusetts House of Representatives' 12th Middlesex district
 2019–2020 Massachusetts legislature
 2021–2022 Massachusetts legislature

References

External links
 Official website

1948 births
Living people
Democratic Party members of the Massachusetts House of Representatives
Politicians from Newton, Massachusetts
Women state legislators in Massachusetts
21st-century American politicians
21st-century American women politicians
20th-century American politicians
20th-century American women politicians